

Events

January–February 
 January 12 – Persian Constitutional Revolution: A nationalistic coalition of merchants, religious leaders and intellectuals in Persia forces the shah Mozaffar ad-Din Shah Qajar to grant a constitution, and establish a national assembly, the Majlis.
 January 16–April 7 – The Algeciras Conference convenes, to resolve the First Moroccan Crisis between France and Germany.
 January 22 – The  strikes a reef off Vancouver Island, Canada, killing over 100 (officially 136) in the ensuing disaster.
 January 31 – The Ecuador–Colombia earthquake (8.8 on the Moment magnitude scale), and associated tsunami, cause at least 500 deaths.
 February 7 –  is launched, sparking a naval race between Britain and Germany.
 February 11 
 Pope Pius X publishes the encyclical Vehementer Nos, denouncing the 1905 French law on the Separation of the Churches and the State.
 Two British members of a poll tax collecting expedition are killed near Richmond, Natal, sparking the Bambatha Rebellion.

March–April 
 March 4 – Native American tribal governments are terminated in Indian Territory, a prerequisite for creating the US state of Oklahoma in 1907.
 March 10 – Courrières mine disaster: An explosion in a coal mine in France kills 1,060.
 March 18 – In France, Romanian inventor Traian Vuia becomes the first person to achieve an unassisted takeoff in a heavier-than-air powered monoplane, but it is incapable of sustained flight.
 April 14 – The Azusa Street Revival, the primary catalyst for the revival of Pentecostalism this century, opens in Los Angeles.
 April 18
 The San Francisco Earthquake (estimated magnitude 7.8) on the San Andreas Fault destroys much of San Francisco, California, killing at least 3,000, with 225,000–300,000 left homeless, and $350 million in damages.
 Xerox, the global digital office machine brand, is founded in Rochester, New York as the Haloid Photographic Company.
 April 23 – In the Russian Empire, the Fundamental Laws are announced at the first state Duma.

May–June 
 May 27 – The first inmates are moved to the Culion leper colony, by the American Insular Government of the Philippine Islands.
 May 29 – Karl Staaff steps down as Prime Minister of Sweden, over the issue of expanded voting rights. He is replaced by right-wing naval officer and public official Arvid Lindman.
 June 7 – Cunard liner  is launched in Glasgow, as the world's largest ship.
 June 26 – The first Grand Prix is held in Le Mans, France.

July–August 
 July 6 – The Second Geneva Convention meets.
 July 12 – Alfred Dreyfus is exonerated. He is reinstalled in the French Army on July 21, thus ending the Dreyfus affair.
 July 20 – In Finland, a new electoral law is ratified, guaranteeing the country the first and equal right to vote in the world. Finnish women become the first in Europe to receive the right to vote.
 August 4 – The first Imperial German Navy submarine, U-1, is launched.
 August 16 – 1906 Valparaíso earthquake: A magnitude 8.2 earthquake in Valparaíso, Chile leaves approximately 20,000 injured.
 August 23 – Unable to control a rebellion, Cuban President Tomás Estrada Palma requests United States intervention. This leads to the Second Occupation of Cuba, which lasts until 1909.

September–October 
 September 11 – Mahatma Gandhi coins the term Satyagraha, to characterize the nonviolence movement in South Africa.
 September 18 – A typhoon and tsunami kill an estimated 10,000 in Hong Kong.
 September 30 – The first Gordon Bennett Cup in ballooning is held, starting in Paris. The winning team, piloting the balloon United States, lands in Fylingdales, Yorkshire, England.
 October 1 – The Grand Duchy of Finland becomes the first nation to include the right of women to stand as candidates, when it adopts universal suffrage.
 October 6 – The Majlis of Iran convenes for the first time.
 October 11 – A United States diplomatic crisis with Japan arises, when the San Francisco public school board orders Japanese students to be taught in racially segregated schools (it is resolved by next year).
 October 16 – Imposter Wilhelm Voigt impersonates a Prussian officer, and takes over the city hall in Köpenick for a short time.
 October 23 – An aeroplane of Alberto Santos-Dumont takes off at Bagatelle in France, and flies 60 meters (200 feet). This is the first officially recorded powered flight in Europe.
 October 28 – The Union Minière du Haut Katanga, a Belgian mining trust, is created in the Congo.

November–December 
 November 1 – International Exhibition opens in Christchurch, New Zealand.
 November 3 – SOS becomes an international distress signal.
 November 22 – Russian Prime Minister Pyotr Stolypin introduces agrarian reforms, aimed at creating a large class of land-owning peasants.
 December 4 – Alpha Phi Alpha fraternity forms at Cornell University, Ithaca, New York; it is the first Black Greek-lettered collegiate order of its kind.
 December 15 – The London Underground's Great Northern, Piccadilly and Brompton Railway opens.
 December 22 – The  7.9 1906 Manasi earthquake in Xinjiang, China kills nearly 300 people.
 December 24 – Reginald Fessenden makes the first radio broadcast: a poetry reading, a violin solo, and a speech, from Brant Rock, Massachusetts.
 December 26 – The world's first feature film, The Story of the Kelly Gang, is first shown, at the Melbourne Athenaeum in Australia.
 December 30 – The All-India Muslim League is founded as a political party in Dhaka in the British Raj; it becomes a driving force for the creation of an independent Pakistan.

Date unknown 
 7.2 Magnitude Earthquake, 15 km depth, Calabria, Italy.
 The BCG vaccine for tuberculosis is first developed.
 Richard Oldham argues that the Earth has a molten interior.
 Construction begins on the modern-day Great Mosque of Djenné.
 The Simplo Filler Pen Company is founded, later to become the Montblanc Company in Germany.
 HaRishon Le Zion-Yafo Association is officially founded as a sports club in Palestine, predecessor of Maccabi Tel Aviv (Israel).

Births

January–February 

 January 6 – Walter Battiss, South African artist (d. 1982)
 January 11 – Albert Hofmann, Swiss chemist (d. 2008)
 January 12 – Eric Birley, British historian and archaeologist (d. 1995)
 January 13 – Zhou Youguang, Chinese linguist (d. 2017)
 January 14 – William Bendix, American film, radio, and television actor (d. 1964)
 January 15 – Aristotle Onassis, Greek shipping magnate (d. 1975)
 January 16 – Diana Wynyard, English actress (d. 1964)
 January 20 – Bretaigne Windust, American stage, film, and television director (d. 1960)
 January 21 – Igor Moiseyev, Russian choreographer (d. 2007)
 January 22 – Robert E. Howard, American author (d. 1936)
 January 28 – Pat O'Callaghan, Irish athlete (d. 1991)
 February 4
 Dietrich Bonhoeffer, German religious, resistance leader (d. 1945)
 Clyde Tombaugh, American astronomer (d. 1997)
 February 5 – John Carradine, American actor (d. 1988)
 February 7 
 Oleg Antonov, Soviet aircraft designer (d. 1984)
 Puyi, Last Emperor of China (d. 1967)
 February 8 – Chester Carlson, American physicist, inventor (d. 1968)
 February 10
 Lon Chaney Jr., American actor (d. 1973)
 Erik Rhodes, American actor and singer (d. 1990)
 February 14 – Nazim al-Qudsi, 26th Prime Minister of Syria and 14th President of Syria (d. 1998)
 February 17
 Mary Brian, American actress (d. 2002)
 Galo Plaza, 29th President of Ecuador (d. 1987)
 February 18 – Hans Asperger, Austrian pediatrician (d. 1980)
 February 22 – Helge Kjærulff-Schmidt, Danish actor (d. 1982)
 February 26 – Madeleine Carroll, British actress (d. 1987)
 February 28 – Bugsy Siegel, American gangster (d. 1947)

March–April 

 March 1
 Phạm Văn Đồng, Prime Minister of Vietnam (d. 2000)
 Abdus Sattar, 8th President of Bangladesh (d. 1985)
 March 6 – Lou Costello, American actor (d. 1959)
 March 7 – Elmar Lipping, Estonian statesman, soldier (d. 1994)
 March 8 – Victor Hasselblad, Swedish inventor, photographer (d. 1978)
 March 12 – Yin Shun, Chinese Buddhist master (d. 2005)
 March 13 – Dave Kaye, British pianist (d. 1996)
 March 16 – Francisco Ayala, Spanish writer (d. 2009)
 March 17
 Brigitte Helm, German film actress (d. 1996)
 Ermance Rejebian, Armenian American book reviewer, lecturer, broadcaster, and writer (d. 1989)
 March 19
 Adolf Eichmann, German war criminal (d. 1962)
 Roy Roberts, American actor (d. 1975)
 March 20 – Ozzie Nelson, American actor, director and producer (d. 1975)
 March 21 – Jim Thompson, American businessman (disappeared 1967)
 March 25 – A. J. P. Taylor, English historian (d. 1990)
 March 26
 Rafael Méndez, Mexican trumpet player (d. 1981)
 Ronald Urquhart, British general (d. 1968)
 March 31 – Shin'ichirō Tomonaga, Japanese physicist, Nobel Prize laureate (d. 1979)
 April 1 – Alexander Sergeyevich Yakovlev, Russian engineer, airplane designer (d. 1989)
 April 4 – Bea Benaderet, American actress (d. 1968)
 April 6 – Luis Alberti, Dominican Republic musician (d. 1976)
 April 6 – Virginia Hall,  American spy with the Special Operations Executive during WWII (d. 1982)
 April 9 – Antal Doráti, Hungarian conductor (d. 1988)
 April 11 – Julia Clements, English flower arranger and author (d. 2010)
 April 13 – Samuel Beckett, Irish writer, Nobel Prize laureate (d. 1989)
 April 14 – Broda Otto Barnes, American medical researcher (d. 1988)
 April 22 – Eddie Albert, American actor and activist (d. 2005)
 April 24 – William Joyce, Irish-American World War II Nazi propaganda broadcaster ("Lord Haw-Haw") (d. 1946)
 April 25
 Joel Brand, Hungarian rescue worker (d. 1964)
 William J. Brennan Jr., Associate Justice of the Supreme Court of the United States (d. 1997)
 A. W. Haydon, American inventor (d. 1982)
 April 28
 Tony Accardo, American gangster (d. 1992)
 Kurt Gödel, Austrian logician, mathematician, and philosopher of mathematics (d. 1978)
 Paul Sacher, Swiss conductor (d. 1999)
April 29 – Pedro Vargas, Mexican singer and actor (d. 1989)

May–June 

 May 2 – Philippe Halsman, Latvian-born American photographer (d. 1979)
 May 3 – Mary Astor, American actress and writer (d. 1987)
 May 6 – André Weil, French mathematician (d. 1998)
 May 7 – Jon Lormer, American actor (d. 1986)
 May 8 – Roberto Rossellini, Italian director (d. 1977)
 May 10 – António Ferreira Gomes, Portuguese Roman Catholic archbishop (d. 1989)
 May 11 
 Jacqueline Cochran, American aviator (d. 1980)
 Richard Arvin Overton, oldest living man in the United States and oldest surviving American veteran (World War II) (d. 2018)
 Ethel Weed, American promoter of Japanese women's rights (d. 1975)
 May 15 – Humberto Delgado, Portuguese general, politician (d. 1965)
 May 16 – Arturo Uslar Pietri, Venezuelan writer (d. 2001)
 May 17 – Jack Carr, American actor and animator (d. 1967)
 May 19
 Bruce Bennett, American athlete, actor (d. 2007)
 Jimmy MacDonald, Scottish-American sound effects artist, voice actor (d. 1991)
 May 20 – Giuseppe Siri, Italian Roman Catholic cardinal (d. 1989)
 May 23 – Lucha Reyes, Mexican singer (d. 1944)
 May 27 – Buddhadasa, Buddhist monk (d. 1993)
 May 29 – T. H. White, British writer (d. 1964)
 May 30 – Bruno Gröning, German faith healer (d. 1959)
 June 3 – Josephine Baker, American-born French entertainer (d. 1975)
 June 4 – Ivan Knunyants, Soviet chemist (d. 1990)
 June 6 – Max August Zorn, German-born American mathematician (d. 1993)
 June 10 – Tekla Juniewicz, Polish supercentenarian, oldest Polish person ever, last surviving person born in 1906 (d. 2022)
 June 12 – Sandro Penna, Italian poet (d. 1977)
 June 15 – Léon Degrelle, Belgian fascist (d. 1994)
 June 17
 James H. Flatley, American admiral, aviator (d. 1958)
 Olli Ungvere, Estonian actress (d. 1991) 
 June 19 – Sir Ernst Chain, German-born British biochemist, Nobel Prize laureate (d. 1979)
 June 21 – Grete Sultan, German-American pianist (d. 2005)
 June 22
 George W. Clarke, American politician (d. 2006)
 Anne Morrow Lindbergh, American author, aviator (d. 2001)
 Billy Wilder, Austrian-born American screenwriter, film director and producer (d. 2002)
 June 24
 Pierre Fournier, French cellist (d. 1986)
 George Alexander Gale, Canadian politician (d. 1997)
 June 26 
 Viktor Schreckengost, American industrial designer, teacher, sculptor and artist (d. 2008)
 M. P. Sivagnanam, Indian politician (d. 1995)
 June 27 – Catherine Cookson, English author (d. 1998)
 June 28 
 Maria Goeppert Mayer, German physicist, Nobel Prize laureate (d. 1972)
 Yoshimi Ueda, Japanese basketball player, administrator (d. 1996)
 June 29 – Heinz Harmel, German officer (d. 2000)

July–August 

 July 1 
 Jean Dieudonné, French mathematician, academic (d. 1992)
 Estée Lauder, American cosmetics entrepreneur (d. 2004)
 Ivan Neill, British Army officer and Irish Unionist politician (d. 2001)
 July 2
 Hans Bethe, German-born American physicist, Nobel Prize laureate (d. 2005)
 Károly Kárpáti, Hungarian Jewish wrestler  (d. 1996)
 Séra Martin, French middle-distance runner (d. 1993)
 July 3 
 Alberto Lleras Camargo, Colombian politician, 20th President of Colombia (d. 1990)
 George Sanders, British actor (d. 1972)
 July 4 – Vincent Schaefer, American chemist, meteorologist (d. 1993)
 July 7
 William Feller, Croatian-born mathematician (d. 1970)
 Helene Johnson, African-American poet (d. 1995)
 Hugh McMahon, Scottish footballer (d. 1997)
 Satchel Paige, American baseball player (d. 1982)
 July 8 – Philip Johnson, American architect (d. 2005)
 July 9 – Roy Leaper, Australian rules footballer (d. 2002)
 July 10 – Ad Liska, American baseball pitcher (d. 1998)
 July 11 – Herbert Wehner, German politician (d. 1990)
 July 12 – Pietro Tordi, Italian actor (d. 1990)
 July 14 – Stan Devenish Meares,  Australian obstetrician, gynaecologist (d. 1994)
 July 16
 Ichimaru, Japanese singer (d. 1997)
 Vincent Sherman, American director, actor (d. 2006)
 James Still, American poet, novelist and folklorist (d. 2001)
 July 17
 Leonila Garcia, 8th First Lady of the Philippines (d. 1994) 
 Dunc Gray, Australian track cyclist (d. 1996)
 July 18 
 Sidney Darlington, American engineer (d. 1997)
 S. I. Hayakawa, Canadian-born American academic, politician (d. 1992)
 Speed Webb, American jazz drummer, territory band leader (d. 1994)
 July 21 – Caroline Smith, American diver (d. 1994)
 July 23 – Vladimir Prelog, Croatian chemist, Nobel Prize laureate (d. 1998)
 August 5
 Joan Hickson, British actress (d. 1998)
 John Huston, American film director, screenwriter, and actor (d. 1987)
 Wassily Leontief, Russian economist, Nobel Prize laureate (d. 1999)
 August 5 – Marie-José of Belgium, last Queen of Italy (d. 2001)
 August 14 – Horst P. Horst, German photographer (d. 1999)
 August 17 – Marcelo Caetano, Prime Minister of Portugal (d. 1980)
 August 19 – Philo Farnsworth, American inventor (d. 1971)
 August 21 – Friz Freleng, American cartoon director (d. 1995)
 August 23 – Zoltan Sarosy, Canadian chess master (d. 2017)
 August 26 – Albert Sabin, Polish-American medical researcher (d. 1993) 
 August 27 – Ed Gein, American serial killer (d. 1984)
 August 28 – John Betjeman, English poet (d. 1984)
 August 30 – Joan Blondell, American actress (d. 1979)

September 

 September 1
 Joaquín Balaguer, 41st, 45th, & 49th President of the Dominican Republic, writer (d. 2002)
 Franz Biebl, German composer (d. 2001)
 Eleanor Burford, English writer (d. 1993)
 September 2 – Barbara Jo Allen, American actress (d. 1974)
 September 4 – Max Delbrück, German biologist, Nobel Prize laureate (d. 1981)
 September 5 
 Ralston Crawford, American abstract painter, lithographer, and photographer (d. 1978)
 Sunnyland Slim, American blues pianist (d. 1995)
 September 6 – Luis Federico Leloir, French-born Argentine chemist, Nobel Prize laureate (d. 1987)
 September 8 – Andrei Kirilenko, Soviet politician (d. 1990)
 September 12 – Lee Erwin, American television writer (d. 1972)
 September 17 – J. R. Jayewardene, President of Sri Lanka (d. 1996)
 September 25
 José Figueres Ferrer, 32nd, 34th, & 38th President of Costa Rica (d. 1990)
 Dmitri Shostakovich, Russian composer (d. 1975)
 September 27 – William Empson, English poet, critic (d. 1984)

October 

 October 6 – Janet Gaynor, American Academy Award-winning actress (d. 1984)
 October 9
 Georges Marie Anne, politician (d. 2001)
 Léopold Sédar Senghor, 1st President of Senegal (d. 2001)
 October 10 – Rasipuram Krishnaswamy Narayan, Indian novelist (d. 2001)
 October 14
 Imam Hassan al-Banna, Egyptian founder of the Muslim Brotherhood (d. 1949)
 Hannah Arendt, German political theorist (d. 1975)
 October 19 – Bandō Mitsugorō VIII, Japanese actor (d. 1975)
 October 23 – Gertrude Ederle, American swimmer (d. 2003)
 October 24 – Marie-Louise von Motesiczky, Austrian painter (d. 1996)
 October 26 – Primo Carnera, Italian boxer (d. 1967)
 October 27 – Kazuo Ohno, Japanese dancer (d. 2010)
 October 29 – Fredric Brown, American writer (d. 1972)

November–December 

 November 2
 Ferit Melen, 14th Prime Minister of Turkey (d. 1988)
 Luchino Visconti, Italian theatre, cinema director, writer (d. 1976)
 November 4 – Willie Love, American Delta blues pianist (d. 1953)
 November 5
 Philip Roberts, British general (d. 1997)
 Fred Lawrence Whipple, American astronomer (d. 2004)
 November 9 – Arthur Rudolph, German rocket engineer (d. 1996)
 November 10 – Josef Kramer, German Nazi concentration camp commandant (d. 1945)
 November 13
 Wanrong, last Empress of China (d. 1946)
 Hermione Baddeley, English character actress (d. 1986)
 Eugenio Mendoza, Venezuelan business tycoon (d. 1979)
 November 14
 Albrecht Becker, German production designer, photographer, and actor (d. 2002) 
 Louise Brooks, American actress (d. 1985)
 November 15 – Curtis LeMay, United States Air Force general, vice-presidential candidate (d. 1990)
 November 16 – Henri Charrière, French author (d. 1973)
 November 17
 Betty Bronson, American actress (d. 1979)
 Soichiro Honda, Japanese industrialist (d. 1991)
 November 18
 Alec Issigonis, Greek-born British automobile designer (d. 1988)
 Klaus Mann, German writer (d. 1949)
 George Wald, American scientist, Nobel Prize laureate (d. 1997)
 November 19 – Patriarch Paul II Cheikho (b. 1989)
 November 22 – Jørgen Juve, Norwegian football player and journalist (d. 1983)
 November 24 – Don MacLaughlin, American actor (d. 1986)
 December 2
 Peter Carl Goldmark, Hungarian-born American engineer (d. 1977)
 Franz Reichleitner, Austrian SS officer and Nazi concentration camp commandant (d. 1944)
 Donald Woods, Canadian-American film, television actor (d. 1998)
 December 5 – Ahn Eak-tai, Korean composer (d. 1965)
 December 9 – Grace Hopper, American computer scientist, naval officer (d. 1992)
 December 13
 Princess Marina of Greece and Denmark (d. 1968)
 Laurens van der Post, South African author, journalist (d. 1996)
 December 19 – Leonid Brezhnev, Soviet leader (d. 1982)
 December 24 – James Hadley Chase, English writer (d. 1985)
 December 25 – Ernst Ruska, German physicist, Nobel Prize laureate (d. 1988)
 December 26 – Imperio Argentina, Argentinian singer, actress (d. 2003)
 December 27 – Oscar Levant, American pianist, composer, author, comedian, and actor (d. 1972)
 December 30 
 Alziro Bergonzo, Italian architect, painter (d. 1997)
 Carol Reed, English film director (d. 1976)

Deaths

January–June 

 January 1 – Todor Ivanchov, 11th Prime Minister of Bulgaria (b. 1858)
 January 13 – Alexander Stepanovich Popov, Russian physicist (b. 1859)
 January 18 – Sir William Forbes Gatacre, British general (b. 1843)
 January 19 – Bartolomé Mitre, Argentine statesman, military figure and author, 6th President of Argentina (b. 1821)
 January 20 – Maria Cristina of the Immaculate Conception Brando, Italian Roman Catholic nun, saint (b. 1856)
 January 25 – Joseph Wheeler, American general, politician (b. 1836)
 January 29 – King Christian IX of Denmark (b. 1818)
 February 8 – Giuseppina Gabriella Bonino, Italian Roman Catholic religious professed (b. 1843)
 February 9 – Paul Laurence Dunbar, American poet and publisher (b. 1872)
 February 13 – Albert Gottschalk, Danish painter (b. 1866)
 February 18 – John B. Stetson, American hat maker (b. 1830)
 February 26 – Jean Lanfray, Swiss convicted murderer (b. 1874)
 February 27 – Samuel Langley, American astronomer, physicist, and aeronautics pioneer (b. 1834)
 March 1 – José María de Pereda, Spanish writer (b. 1833)
 March 4 – John Schofield, American general (b. 1831)
 March 8 – Henry Baker Tristram, English clergyman, ornithologist (b. 1822)
 March 12 – Manuel Quintana, 15th President of Argentina (b. 1835)
 March 13 
 Susan B. Anthony, American civil rights, women's suffrage activist (b. 1820)
 Joseph Monier, French gardener, inventor (b. 1823)
 March 17 – Johann Most, German-American anarchist (b. 1846)
 March 19 – Victor Fatio, Swiss zoologist (b. 1838)
 March 20 – Adeline Dutton Train Whitney, American author of juvenile literature for girls (b. 1824)
 March 23 – Thomas Lake Harris, American poet (b. 1823)
 March 29 
 Slava Raškaj, Croatian painter (b. 1877)
 Albert Sorel, French historian (b. 1842)
 April 6 – Alexander Kielland, Norwegian author (b. 1849)
 April 19
 Pierre Curie, French physicist, Nobel Prize laureate (b. 1859)
 Spencer Gore, British tennis player, cricketer (b. 1850)
 April 25 – John Knowles Paine, American composer (b. 1839)
 May 10 – Hashim Jalilul Alam Aqamaddin, Sultan of Brunei (b. 1825)
 May 14 – Carl Schurz, German revolutionary, American statesman (b. 1829)
 May 23 – Henrik Ibsen, Norwegian playwright (b. 1828)
 June 5 – Eduard von Hartmann, German philosopher (b. 1842)
 June 10 – Richard Seddon, 15th Prime Minister of New Zealand (b. 1845)
 June 17 – Harry Nelson Pillsbury, American chess champion (b. 1872)
 June 25 – Stanford White, American architect (b. 1853)

July–December 

 July 1 – Manuel García, Spanish opera singer, music educator and vocal pedagogue (b. 1805)
 July 11 – Grace Brown, American murder/and or drowning victim (b. 1886)
 July 17 – Carlos Pellegrini, 11th President of Argentina (b. 1846)
 August 6 – George Waterhouse, 7th Prime Minister of New Zealand (b. 1824)
 August 14 – Aniceto Arce, 27th President of Bolivia (b. 1824)
 August 19 – Ezequiél Moreno y Díaz, Colombian Roman Catholic priest, saint (b. 1848)
 September 1 – Giuseppe Giacosa, Italian poet, librettist (b. 1847)
 September 5 – Ludwig Boltzmann, Austrian physicist (b. 1854)
 September 13 – Emily Pitts Stevens, American school founder (b. 1841)
 September 23 – August Bondeson, Swedish author (b. 1844)
 October 9 – Adelaide Ristori, Italian actress (b. 1822)
 October 16 – Varina Davis, First Lady of the Confederate States of America (b. 1826)
 October 19
 Arthur von Mohrenheim, Russian diplomat (b. 1824)
 Charles Pfizer, German-American chemist, co-founder of Pfizer (b. 1824)
 October 22 – Paul Cézanne, French painter (b. 1839)
 October 23 – Vladimir Stasov, Russian music critic (b. 1824)
 October 30 – Gathorne Gathorne-Hardy, 1st Earl of Cranbrook, British politician (b. 1814)
 November 1 – Archduke Otto of Austria (b. 1865)
 November 7 – Todor Burmov, 1st Prime Minister of Bulgaria (b. 1834)
 November 9 – Saint Elizabeth of the Trinity, French Discalced Carmelite religious professed and saint (b. 1880)
 November 12 – William Rufus Shafter, American general (b. 1835)
 November 16 – Mother Veronica of the Passion, Ottoman-born religious leader (b. 1823)
 November 19, – Georgia Cayvan, American stage actress (b. 1857)
 November 28 – Jennie Yeamans, Australian-born American actress (b. 1862)
 November 30 – Sir Edward Reed, British naval architect, author, politician, and railroad magnate (b. 1830)
 December 7 – Élie Ducommun, Swiss journalist and activist, Nobel Prize laureate (b. 1833)
 December 8 – Sylvia Gerrish, American musical theatre star (b. 1860)
 December 13 – Jan Gerard Palm, Dutch composer (b. 1831)
 December 21 – Rajendrasuri, Indian religious reformer (b. 1827)
 December 30 – Josephine Butler, British feminist, social reformer (b. 1828)

Nobel Prizes 

 Physics – J. J. Thomson
 Chemistry – Henri Moissan
 Medicine – Camillo Golgi and Santiago Ramón y Cajal
 Literature – Giosuè Carducci
 Peace – Theodore Roosevelt

References

Sources
 , comprehensive guide to political events worldwide; emphasis on Britain

Further reading
 Gilbert, Martin. A History of the Twentieth Century: Volume 1 1900-1933 (1997); global coverage of politics, diplomacy and warfare; pp 123 – 42.
 Hazell's Annual for 1907 (1907), worldwide events of 1906; 734pp  online